MyAllSearch is a multi metasearch engine that provides search results from a number of different search engines.  MyAllSearch offers standard web searches, image searches, video searches, news searches and blog searches.  Results are available from major search engines, such as Google, Yahoo, Bing & DuckDuckGo.

Metasearch
MyAllSearch does not combine the results from its source search engines.  Instead, tabs are used to filter and organise the results from source engines.  When a user carries out a search, the first results that are displayed are those from the search engine assigned to the first tab.  The user can then click on other tabs available to see the results from other source engines.  Users can also change the search category to one of the other search categories.

Search Engine Optimization 
Search Engine Optimization (SEO) is the active practice of improving aspects of your website so that commercial search engines (such as Google, Bing, and Yahoo) can find and display your Web pages in the results when they're relevant to a searcher's query as stated by Digital.gov part of the U.S. General Services Administration. Marketing related decisions are no longer guided just by hypothesis and past experience. Influential marketing ideas are now determined by analytics and big data. By utilizing past data and predictive analytics, businesses can now generate better return on investment and provide insights that can lead to effective business strategies and decisions within an organization as stated by Forbes.

See also
Metasearch engine
List of search engines

References

External links
MyAllSearch homepage

Internet search engines